Francine Ouellette (born March 11, 1947) is a Canadian writer living in Quebec.

She was born in Montreal and was educated at the École des beaux-arts de Montréal. Ouellette taught plastic arts at the École Polyvalente Mont-Laurier. In the 1970s, she left teaching and moved to Schefferville to pursue flying and writing. She wrote Les ailes du destin which was only published some 20 years later. She later moved back to the Mont-Laurier region. In 2013, she received the Ludger-Duvernay Prize for her collected work.

Selected works 
 Le Sorcier, novel (1985), received the 
 Sir Gaby du lac, novel (1989), received the Prix Citoyenne de la nature
 Le Grand Blanc, novel (1993), received the 
 Bécassine, l’oiseau invisible, youth literature (1999)
 Feu, La rivière profanée, novel (2004), received the Grand prix de la Culture des Laurentides
 Feu, Fleur de lys, novel (2007), received the Prix ANEL-AQPF

References

External links 
 
  Francine Ouellette fonds (R14228) at Library and Archives Canada

1947 births
Living people
Writers from Quebec
Canadian novelists in French